Nyah Kur may refer to:

Nyah Kur language, a Mon-Khmer language spoken in Thailand
Nyah Kur people, an indigenous ethnic group in Thailand related to the Mon